John Creemer Clarke (1821 – 11 February 1895) was an English merchant and cloth manufacturer and a Liberal politician who sat in the House of Commons from 1874 to 1885.

Early life
Clarke was the son of Robert Clarke of St Giles in the Wood, Devon and his wife Graciana Creemer, daughter of John Creemer of Exbourne Devon.

Career
He started work in a drapery business in Bideford before moving to Abingdon from Devon in 1840. He joined the firm of Hyde and Son, clothing manufacturers before it became Hyde, Son and Clarke, and finally Clarke, Sons and Co. The factory in West St Helen Street employed 2,000 people at one stage making it one of the largest clothing manufacturers in the country.

He was a Justice of the Peace for Abingdon-on-Thames and Mayor of Abingdon-on-Thames in 1869. He was also Chairman of Abingdon Railway Company from 1873.

At the 1874 general election, Clarke was elected as the Member of Parliament (MP) for Abingdon. He was re-elected in 1880 and he held the seat until he retired from Parliament at the 1885 general election.

Other work
Clarke was a philanthropist who gave land and helped fund the building of Trinity Church often referred to as 'Clarke’s Chapel'. He also funded the building of the cottage hospital in Abingdon in 1886.

He was on the governing body of Abingdon School from c.1890 until 1895 and was a Master of Christ's Hospital of Abingdon.

Personal life
Clarke married firstly in 1845 Anna Maria Avis, daughter of John Avis of  Minehead Somerset. She died in 1848 and in 1849 he married secondly Elizabeth Joyce, daughter of John Joyce of Timberscombe Somerset. The 1861 census shows that he resided at Waste Court, a property that was handed down to his third son Harry Thomas Clarke (a borough magistrate) on his death in 1895. Waste Court is now part of Abingdon School and was renamed Austin House in 2015. Another son John Heber Clarke along with Harry Thomas Clarke were both Mayors of Abingdon.

References

External links 
 

1821 births
1895 deaths
People from Abingdon-on-Thames
Liberal Party (UK) MPs for English constituencies
UK MPs 1874–1880
UK MPs 1880–1885
Governors of Abingdon School
19th-century English businesspeople